Kojčinovac is a place located south of the city of Bijeljina in Republika Srpska, Bosnia and Herzegovina. To the west of Kojčinovac is Modran.

Industry
The main company in Gornji Kojčinovac is STECO CENTAR.

Sport
The main football club is FK Polet Gornji Kojčinovac.

External links
 Bijeljina official website (Serbian)  

Gornji Kojcinovac
Populated places in Bijeljina